Cintheaux is a commune in the Calvados department in the Normandy region in northwestern France.

Geography
The commune is located between Caen and Falaise and is the home to the Bretteville-sur-Laize Canadian War Cemetery.

Gaumesnil was originally a separate village, now attached to Cintheaux; it has fewer than 19 residents.

Sights
The main town is situated around the church of Saint-Germain, classified as an official French historic monument.  It was built around 1150 by the Marmion family; Robert Marmion offered it in patronage to the Barbery Abbey, subject to the Bayeux diocese, in 1181. The main (north) chapel and the cross tower, dating to the 16th century, was destroyed in 1688.  The north bell tower was added in the 18th century.  The church was restored between 1857 and 1902.

History

World War II
Cintheaux was devastated by Allied artillery, which sought to annihilate the 12th SS Panzer Division in 1944, during Operation Totalize.

Population

See also
Communes of the Calvados department

References

Communes of Calvados (department)